The 2002 Uttarakhand Legislative Assembly election were the First Vidhan Sabha (Legislative Assembly) elections of the state when the Indian National Congress emerged as the largest party with 36 seats in the 70-seat legislature in the election. The Bharatiya Janata Party became the official opposition, holding 19 seats.

Party position in the Assembly

Key post holders in the Assembly
 Speaker :  Yashpal Arya
 Deputy Speaker : Vacant
 Leader of  the House:  Narayan Datt Tiwari
 Leader of the Opposition : Bhagat Singh Koshyari (2002–2003)Matbar Singh Kandari (2003–2004)
 Chief Secretary :

List of the First Assembly members

By-elections

See also
 2002 Uttarakhand Legislative Assembly election
 Tiwari ministry
 Politics of Uttarakhand

Notes
 § – Disqualified from office
 ‡ – Resigned from office

References

Indian politics articles by importance
Uttarakhand Legislative Assembly